Onondaga is a town in Onondaga County, New York, United States encompassing 65 square miles. As of the 2020 U.S. Census, the town had a population of 22,937. The town is named after the native Onondaga tribe, part of the Iroquois Confederacy. Onondaga was incorporated April 2, 1798 and is located southwest of the city of Syracuse, which it borders. The villages and hamlets which make up the town are: Cedarvale, Howlett Hill, Navarino, Nedrow, Onondaga Hill, Sentinel Heights, South Onondaga, Southwood, Split Rock, and Taunton.

History 
Native Americans have inhabited the region for centuries. As early as 1600, Onondaga was a village that served as the capital of the Iroquois League and the primary settlement of the Onondaga people. During the American Revolution, the Onondagas sided with the British, and Onondaga was attacked by the Continental Army on April 21, 1779. After the war, the Onondagas were forced to cede their lands in New York to the new state, although some land was set aside to form the Onondaga Reservation. Most of the Onondagas left New York and were resettled in Upper Canada.

The Onondaga region was within what was designated the Central New York Military Tract, in which the new government allotted land grants to veterans as payment for their war service. In the postwar years, the area was flooded with migrants from New England and eastern New York. The Town of Onondaga was incorporated on April 2, 1798 from parts of other towns, with several subsequent boundary changes. When Onondaga County was formed in 1794, the town was established originally from parts of the Towns of Marcellus, Pompey, and Manlius.

The first court house for the County of Onondaga was built in 1805 on the public square in Onondaga Hill, which was then the county seat. The building was laid out by surveyor and engineer James Geddes (see Town of Geddes). After the county seat was moved to Syracuse in 1830, the building in Onondaga Hill was used as a school until 1846.

The Gen. Orrin Hutchinson House - which is now the Inn of the Seasons restaurant - at 4311 W. Seneca Turnpike is the only Town of Onondaga site listed in the National Register of Historic Places.

Geography

Interstate 81 passes along the eastern side of the town. U.S. Route 11 is a north–south highway in the eastern part of Onondaga, paralleling the interstate. U.S. Route 20 is an east–west highway in the south of the town. New York State Route 173 is an east–west highway through the middle of Onondaga. New York State Route 11A diverges westward from US-11. New York State Route 80 cuts through the southern part of the town.

Demographics

As of the census of 2020, there were approximately 23,000 people, 7,679 households, and 5,513 families residing in the town.  The population density was 364.9 people per square mile (140.9/km2).  There were 7,964 housing units at an average density of 138.0 per square mile (53.3/km2).  The racial makeup of the town was 94.29% White, 1.96% African American, 1.07% Native American, 1.16% Asian, 0.04% Pacific Islander, 0.16% from other races, and 1.32% from two or more races. Hispanic or Latino of any race were 1.05% of the population.

There were 7,679 households, out of which 35.1% had children under the age of 18 living with them, 60.4% were married couples living together, 8.1% had a female householder with no husband present, and 28.2% were non-families. 23.5% of all households were made up of individuals, and 11.2% had someone living alone who was 65 years of age or older.  The average household size was 2.64 and the average family size was 3.15.

In the town, the population was spread out, with 26.5% under the age of 18, 5.4% from 18 to 24, 27.2% from 25 to 44, 23.7% from 45 to 64, and 17.2% who were 65 years of age or older.  The median age was 40 years. For every 100 females, there were 92.0 males.  For every 100 females age 18 and over, there were 86.7 males.

The median income for a household in the town was $53,421, and the median income for a family was $63,674. Males had a median income of $42,495 versus $31,160 for females. The per capita income for the town was $25,522.  About 2.6% of families and 4.2% of the population were below the poverty line, including 3.8% of those under age 18 and 6.7% of those age 65 or over.

Geography 

The Town of Onondaga, located in the county of Onondaga and the state of New York, was incorporated April 2, 1798, and has undergone several boundary changes since that time. The present size is 65 square miles with a population of approximately 23,000. The villages and hamlets which make up the town are: Cedarvale, Howlett Hill, Navarino, Nedrow, Onondaga Hill, Sentinel Heights, South Onondaga, Southwood, Split Rock, and Taunton.

References

External links
 Town of Onondaga official website
 The Town of Onondaga Historical Society
  Summary history of the Town of Onondaga
  Genealogy/history of Onondaga

Syracuse metropolitan area
Towns in Onondaga County, New York